Aubertite is a mineral with the chemical formula CuAl(SO4)2Cl·14H2O. It is colored blue. Its crystals are triclinic pedial. It is transparent. It has vitreous luster. It is not radioactive. Aubertite is rated 2-3 on the Mohs Scale. The sample was collected by J. Aubert (born 1929), assistant director, National Institute of Geophysics, France, in the year 1961. Its type locality is Queténa Mine, Toki Cu deposit, Chuquicamata District, Calama, El Loa Province, Antofagasta Region, Chile.

References
Webmineral.com - Aubertite
Mindat.org - Aubertite
Handbook of Mineralogy - Aubertite

Copper(II) minerals
Halide minerals
Sulfate minerals
Triclinic minerals
Minerals in space group 2